Ho Chi Minh City Police F.C. were a Vietnamese football club based in Ho Chi Minh City. They were champions in the 1995 season of the V-League, Vietnam's top-level association football league. They placed as runners-up in the 1993–94, 1996, 1999–2000, and 2001–02 seasons. Star striker Lê Huỳnh Đức, who later went on to lead Đà Nẵng F.C. to win the 2009 V-League championship as manager, played for the club from 1992 through 2000. In 1998, the team played a nationally televised friendly match against the semi-professional San Francisco Bay Seals, winning 3–1. The match marked the first time an American professional soccer team had played in post-war Vietnam.

Achievements

National competitions
League
V.League 1:
 Winners :       1995
 Runners-up :  1993–94, 1996, 1999–2000, 2001–02
Cup
Vietnamese Cup:
 Winners :       1998,2001
 Runners-up :  2000
Vietnamese Super Cup:
 Runners-up :  1999, 2001

Notes and references

Police association football clubs in Vietnam
Football clubs in Ho Chi Minh City